Lužnice is a Slavic toponym, derived from the root lug (Proto-Slavic *lǫgъ), meaning lye and meadow. It may refer to several place names:

Lužnice (river), Czech Republic and Austria
Lužnice, Kragujevac, Serbia
Lužnice (Jindřichův Hradec District), Czech Republic